Kanak Vardhan Singh Deo is an Indian politician and member of the Bharatiya Janata Party. He belongs to the erstwhile royal family of Patna (princely state), Bolangir. He was a cabinet minister in the Odisha government and ex state president of BJP Odisha unit.

Singh Deo was a member of the Odisha Legislative Assembly from the Patnagarh constituency in Bolangir district.

Singh Deo was a Cabinet Minister of Industry and Public Enterprise from 2000 to 2004 and from 2004 to 2009, he was Cabinet Minister for Urban Development and Public Enterprise in Government of Odisha under Naveen Patnaik until Patnaik left National Democratic Alliance in 2009.

His wife is a Member of the Parliament of 16th, also she was a member of the 12th, 13th and 14th Lok Sabha of India. He represented the Bolangir constituency of Odisha and is a member of the Bharatiya Janata Party. He is also a member of the National executive of the party.

References 

Bharatiya Janata Party politicians from Odisha
Members of the Odisha Legislative Assembly
1961 births
Living people
21st-century Indian politicians
People from Balangir